Vitaly Borisovich Efimov (born 4 April 1940, Sovkhoz Red Dawn, Moscow Oblast) is a Russian political figure and a deputy of the 6th, 7th, and 8th State Dumas.
 
From 1967 to 1991, Efimov was a member of the Communist Party of the Soviet Union. From 1976 to 1983, he worked as the Chief Engineer of the Volga-Vyatka Territorial Transport Administration of the Ministry of Road Transport of the RSFSR. In 1983-1986, he headed the Gorky Territorial Association of Transport "Gorkiyavtotrans" of the Ministry of Transport of the USSR. From 1986 to 1990, he worked as Deputy Minister of Transport of the RSFSR. On September 8, 1990, he was appointed the Minister of Transport. He left the post in 1996 to become trade representative of the Russian Federation in Hungary. He left the post as he reached retirement age. In 2002, he headed the Committee on Transport of the Chamber of Commerce and Industry of the Russian Federation. In 2011, he was elected deputy of the 6th State Duma from the Mordovia constituency. In 2014, he joined the All-Russia People's Front. In 2016 and 2021, he was re-elected for the 7th, and 8th State Dumas.

References
 

 

1940 births
Living people
United Russia politicians
21st-century Russian politicians
Eighth convocation members of the State Duma (Russian Federation)
Seventh convocation members of the State Duma (Russian Federation)
Sixth convocation members of the State Duma (Russian Federation)
People from Moscow Oblast